Sia Sia-ye Keykhosrow (also Romanized as Sīā Sīā-ye Keykhosrow and Sīā Sīā Keykhosrow; also known as Sīā Sīā-ye Keykhosravī and Sīā Sīā-ye Keykhosrowvī) is a village in Howmeh-ye Jonubi Rural District, in the Central District of Eslamabad-e Gharb County, Kermanshah Province, Iran. At the 2006 census, its population was 679, in 146 families.

References 

Populated places in Eslamabad-e Gharb County